Pate Hole is a solutional cave located adjacent to Asby Gill  south of Great Asby in Cumbria, England. The entrance is normally dry, but in flood it becomes an impressive resurgence. Its name derives from the north country word for badger.

It consists of three main passages. This flows down a low passage to the north for some  where a sump is reached.

The cave is formed in Carboniferous limestone, and is thought to drain the Great Asby Scar area  to the south-west. The resurgence is presumed to be St. Thomas's Well in Great Asby.

The main part of the cave has been known for a long time, and it was an object of curiosity in the nineteenth century. A brief foray into it was described in The Gentleman's Magazine in 1791, and a description appeared in The Monthly Magazine in 1802. The first full description complete with passage lengths appeared in 1813. The first account of an exploration by cavers was in 1941 by members of the Yorkshire Ramblers' Club, and in November 1946 it was surveyed by a group from Appleby Grammar School led by Brian Price. Further exploration took place in 1975-1976 by members of the same group to reach the current limit.

References

Caves of Cumbria
Wild caves
Limestone caves